Jean Guichard, born in Paris, on April 28, 1952, is a French photographer known for his images of lighthouses.  One series of seven pictures, titled La Jument, is world-famous; taken in 1989, it depicts the French lighthouse "La Jument" in a tempest. In the photograph, a wave is about to engulf the lighthouse as its keeper, thinking Guichard's was the rescue helicopter, looks out the open door.

References

Living people
Photographers from Paris
1952 births